Anomaloglossus breweri is a species of frogs in the family Aromobatidae. It is only know from its type locality, Aprada-tepui in the Bolívar state of southeastern Venezuela. This species was discovered by scientists exploring the inaccessible and remote region of Aprada-tepui. It is a fast-moving frog that lives along creeks and in quiet pools along small streams along the slopes near the cave. The frog is named for Charles Brewer-Carías who collected the type series.

Description
The distinctive features of this species are its particular skin pattern, absence of fringes on fingers, moderate toe webbing, tongue characteristics, and yellow and orange coloration on its undersides. The type series consists of one female (the holotype), two males, and one unsexed juvenile. The female measures  and the larger male  in snout–vent length.

Habitat and conservation
It is probably more widespread on the tepui, and perhaps in the surrounding areas. The specimens were found along creeks and in quiet pools along small streams.

Aprada-tepui is located within the boundaries of the Canaima National Park. This species could still be threatened because of its small range, making it sensitive to catastrophic events.

References

breweri
Frogs of South America
Amphibians of Venezuela
Endemic fauna of Venezuela
Amphibians described in 2006
Taxa named by Cesar L. Barrio-Amoros
Amphibians of the Tepuis